Great Hotels is a television show on the Travel Channel. The show, hosted by Samantha Brown, travels around the United States to show some of its most renowned hotels. Brown stays at the hotel and walks the viewer through the layout, the rooms, and extra features the hotel has to offer that make it unique and desirable.

Hotels
Below are some notable hotels that Great Hotels covered.

 Arizona Biltmore Hotel Resort & Spa, Phoenix, Arizona
 Auberge du Soleil, Napa County, California
 Bacara Resort and Spa, Santa Barbara, California
 Bellagio, Las Vegas, Nevada
 The Boulders, Carefree, Arizona
 The Breakers, Palm Beach, Florida
 The Broadmoor, Colorado Springs, Colorado
 Casa Morada, Islamorada, Florida Keys, Florida
 The Chateau Marmont, Los Angeles, California
 The Chatham Bars Inn, Chatham, Massachusetts
 Disney's Animal Kingdom Lodge at Walt Disney World Resort
 Disney's Beach Club Resort at Walt Disney World Resort
 Disney's Fort Wilderness Campground at Walt Disney World Resort
 Disney's Grand Californian Hotel & Spa at Disneyland Resort, Anaheim, California
 Disney's Grand Floridian Resort & Spa at Walt Disney World Resort
 Disney's Wilderness Lodge at Walt Disney World Resort
 Disney's Yacht Club Resort at Walt Disney World Resort
 Daufuskie Island Resort, Hilton Head, South Carolina
 The Don CeSar Beach Resort, St. Pete Beach, Florida
 The Driskill, Austin, Texas
 The Fairmont San Francisco, San Francisco, California
 Four Seasons Hualalai, Hawaii
 Four Seasons Chicago, Chicago, Illinois
 Grove Isle Club and Resort, Coconut Grove, Miami, Florida
 The Hay-Adams, Downtown Washington D.C.
 The Homestead, Hot Springs, Virginia
 Hotel Biba, West Palm Beach, Florida
 Hotel Diva, San Francisco, California
 Hotel George, Downtown Washington D.C.
 Hotel Monaco, Chicago, Illinois
 Hotel Palomar, San Francisco, California
 Hyatt Regency Grand Cypress, Orlando, Florida
 Hyatt Regency Hill Country Resort, Texas
 Hotel Serrano, San Francisco, California
 Hotel Teatro, Denver, Colorado
 The Inn at Little Washington, Washington, Virginia
 The Inn at Montchanin Village, Montchanin, Delaware
 The Kahala Resort and Hotel, Oahu, Hawaii
 Omni La Mansion del Rio, San Antonio, Texas
 La Playa Beach & Golf Resort, Naples, Florida
 Le Pavillon Hotel, New Orleans, Louisiana
 The Hotel, South Beach, Florida
 The Hotel Hershey, Hershey, Pennsylvania
 The Library Hotel, New York City, New York  
 The Lodge at Koele, Hawaii
 The Lodge at Vail, Vail, Colorado
 The Luxor, Las Vegas, Nevada
 Mandalay Bay,  Las Vegas, Nevada
 The Manele Bay Hotel, Hawaii
 Mark Hopkins Inter-Continental, San Francisco, California
 Marshall House, Savannah, Georgia
 Meadowood, Napa Valley, California
 Molokai Lodge, Maunaloa, Moloka'i, Hawaii
 Nine Zero Hotel, Boston, Massachusetts
 The Palmer House Hilton, Chicago, Illinois
 The Palms Casino and Resort, Las Vegas, Nevada
 Park Hyatt Beaver Creek, Colorado
 Park Hyatt Bellevue, Pennsylvania
 The Peninsula, Beverly Hills, California
 Portofino Bay Hotel, Orlando, Florida
 Princeville Hotel, Kauai, Hawaii
 The Renaissance Hollywood Hotel, Hollywood, California
 The Rittenhouse Hilton, Philadelphia, Pennsylvania
 Ritz-Carlton, Amelia Island, Florida
 Ritz-Carlton Half Moon Bay, Half Moon Bay, California
 Ritz-Carlton Naples, Naples, Florida
 Ritz-Carlton New Orleans New Orleans, Louisiana
 The Sagamore, Bolton Landing, New York
 San Jose Hotel, Texas
 Shutters on the Beach, Santa Monica, California
 The St. Regis, New York City, New York
 Monarch Beach Resort, Dana Point, California
 The Standard, Los Angeles, California
 Sunset Key Guest Cottages, Key West, Florida
 Turtle Bay Resort, Oahu, Hawaii
 The Venetian, Las Vegas, Nevada
 The Waldorf-Astoria, New York City, New York
 The Wauwinet, Nantucket, Massachusetts
 The Westin Savannah Harbor Golf Resort & Spa, Savannah, Georgia 
 The Westin St. Francis, San Francisco, California
 Wheatleigh, Lenox, Massachusetts
 W. Honolulu, Honolulu, Hawaii
 W. San Diego, San Diego, California
 Willard Intercontinental, Washington D.C.

Awards and nominations

References

External links
 Great Hotels on imdb.com

Travel Channel original programming
2001 American television series debuts
2006 American television series endings